Fighting Fate is a 1925 American silent sports film directed by Albert S. Rogell and starring Billy Sullivan, Nancy Deaver, and Tom McGuire.

Plot
As described in a film magazine review, Damon Squires, aspiring lightweight boxer, broke while visiting a small town, resents an insult made to Sally O'Leary by a chap whom he knocks down. The latter turns out to be champion boxer Cyclone Winters. A boxing match is arranged with him, but Damon is doped by a bribed trainer and loses the fight. Sally, whose father runs a restaurant, still believes in Damon. Damon obtains proof that he had been double-crossed. In a second match he knocks Winters out, winning the championship and the affection of Sally.

Cast
 Billy Sullivan as Damon Squires - The Fighter
 John Sinclair as Pythias - The Manager 
 Nancy Deaver as Sally O'Leary - The Girl
 Tom McGuire as Danny O'Leary
 Phil Salvadore as Cyclone Winters - The Opponent
 William Buckley as Glen Morgan

References

Bibliography
 Munden, Kenneth White. The American Film Institute Catalog of Motion Pictures Produced in the United States, Part 1. University of California Press, 1997.

External links
 

1925 films
1920s sports films
1920s English-language films
American silent feature films
American boxing films
American black-and-white films
Rayart Pictures films
Films directed by Albert S. Rogell
1920s American films
Silent sports films